Robert Vișoiu (born 10 February 1996 in Pitești) is a former racing driver from Romania.

Career

Karting
At the age of six, Vișoiu first sat behind the wheel of a kart, the beginning of his karting career. He raced primarily in his native Romania up to 2009, becoming a two-time champion in the Mini Class and champion in the KF3 category. In 2009 Vișoiu switched to International KF3 competitions.

Formula Abarth
In 2011, Vișoiu graduated to single-seaters, racing in the Formula Abarth series for Jenzer Motorsport. Race victory in Misano and another two podiums saw him finish on sixth position in the Italian series. In European Series the Romanian driver finished on fourth place with two race victories, including win in series' finale at Circuit de Catalunya.

GP3 Series
Vișoiu continued his collaboration with Jenzer Motorsport into the GP3 Series in 2012. He finished the season fourteenth overall with twenty-four points, including a podium finish in Barcelona. In 2013, he raced for MW Arden alongside series debutants Daniil Kvyat and Carlos Sainz Jr.

Formula Three
Despite his GP3 commitments, Vișoiu also took part in the 2012 Italian Formula Three Championship with Ghinzani Arco Motorsport. He finished the season ninth overall, scoring two podiums at the Hungaroring and winning the sprint race at the Mugello Circuit round. Vișoiu did not take part in the Misano or Imola rounds, owing to clashes with the Silverstone and Spa-Francorchamps rounds of the GP3 Series season.

GP2 Series
Originally intending to leave motorsport to focus on his education, it was announced that Vișoiu would partake in the 2015 season, racing with Rapax. There he finished seventeenth overall, in sharp contrast to his third placed teammate Sergey Sirotkin.

FIA Formula 2
After a year out of motorsport in 2016, Vișoiu was signed to Campos Racing from the Monaco round of the 2017 season onwards. However Vișoiu departed the series and all forms of motorsport before the Jerez round, calling time on his racing career and subsequently being replaced by Álex Palou.

Racing record

Career summary

Complete GP3 Series results
(key) (Races in bold indicate pole position) (Races in italics indicate fastest lap)

Complete Auto GP results
(key) (Races in bold indicate pole position) (Races in italics indicate fastest lap)

Complete GP2 Series results
(key) (Races in bold indicate pole position) (Races in italics indicate fastest lap)

Complete FIA Formula 2 Championship results
(key) (Races in bold indicate pole position) (Races in italics indicate points for the fastest lap of top ten finishers)

† Driver did not finish the race, but was classified as he completed over 90% of the race distance.

References

External links
 
 

1996 births
Living people
Sportspeople from Pitești
Romanian racing drivers
Formula Abarth drivers
Italian Formula Three Championship drivers
Formula Masters China drivers
GP3 Series drivers
Auto GP drivers
GP2 Series drivers
FIA Formula 2 Championship drivers
Arden International drivers
Rapax Team drivers
Campos Racing drivers
Karting World Championship drivers
Jenzer Motorsport drivers